Beaumont-le-Hareng is a commune in the Seine-Maritime department in the Normandy region in northern France.

Geography

Population

Places of interest
 Traces of a Merovingian fort.
 The church of St.Pierre, dating from the twelfth century.
 The church of St. Denis, dating from the eighteenth century.

See also
Communes of the Seine-Maritime department

References

Communes of Seine-Maritime